The Arboretum at Flagstaff is a  arboretum that is home to 750 species of mostly drought-tolerant adapted and native plants representative of the high-desert Colorado Plateau, home to the Grand Canyon and Zion National Park. The facility is located at 7,150' in elevation, making it one of the highest-elevation public gardens in the United States. The Arboretum has an extensive regional collection of the Penstemon genus and hosts an annual Penstemon Festival.

The Arboretum was originally forest and a working ranch, and the home of Frances McAllister in the late 1960s. She donated the land and created its financial endowment for the Arboretum in 1981.  To support research the Arboretum is also home to the Merriam-Powell Research Station and  Southwest Experimental Garden Array.

See also 

 List of botanical gardens and arboretums in Arizona

References

External links
 The Arboretum at Flagstaff
 Merriam-Powell Research Station

Arboreta in Arizona
Botanical gardens in Arizona
Buildings and structures in Flagstaff, Arizona
Education in Coconino County, Arizona
Tourist attractions in Flagstaff, Arizona
Protected areas of Coconino County, Arizona
Nature centers in Arizona